Lorran Lucas Pereira de Sousa (born 4 July 2006), simply known as Lorran, is a Brazilian professional footballer who plays as an attacking midfielder for Flamengo.

Club career
Born in Rio de Janeiro, Lorran was a Flamengo youth graduate. On 4 July 2022, on his 16th birthday, he signed his first professional contract with the club, until July 2025.

On 26 December 2022, Lorran renewed his contract with Mengão until December 2025. He made his first team debut the following 12 January, coming on as a late substitute for goalscorer Matheus França in a 1–0 Campeonato Carioca home win over Audax Rio, as the regular starters were training for the 2022 FIFA Club World Cup.

Lorran scored his first professional goal on 25 January 2023, netting the equalizer in a 1–1 away draw against Bangu; with 16 years, six months and 20 days, he became the youngest player ever to score in Flamengo's history.

Career statistics

References

2006 births
Living people
Footballers from Rio de Janeiro (city)
Brazilian footballers
Association football midfielders
CR Flamengo footballers